The 1984 Edgbaston Cup was a women's tennis tournament played on outdoor grass courts that was part of the 1984 Virginia Slims World Championship Series. The tournament took place at the Edgbaston Priory Club in Birmingham, United Kingdom and was held from 11 to 17 June 1984.

Entrants

Seeds

Other entrants
The following players received entry from the qualifying draw:
  Lea Antonoplis
  Kathleen Cummings
  Heather Ludloff
  Tina Mochizuki
  Cláudia Monteiro
  Beverly Mould
  Brenda Remilton
  Julie Salmon

The following players received a lucky loser spot:
  Susan Leo
  Molly Van Nostrand

Finals

Singles

 Pam Shriver defeated  Anne White 7–6, 6–3
 It was Shriver's second singles title of the year and the 7th of her career.

Doubles
 Leslie Allen /  Anne White defeated  Barbara Jordan /  Elizabeth Sayers 7–5, 6–3
 It was Allen's 2nd title of the year and the 6th of her career. It was White's 4th title of the year and of her career.

External links
 1984 Edgbaston Cup draws
 International Tennis Federation (ITF) tournament details

Edgbaston Cup
Birmingham Classic (tennis)
Edgbaston Cup
Edgbaston Cup